Tony Nyangweso is a Uganda international rugby union player. He plays at centre and wing.

Rugby Union career

Amateur career

Nyangweso started playing rugby while at his secondary school, Namilyango College.

From there he joined Kobs Rugby Club in Uganda. Sponsored by mobile phone company Dmark, the side is now known as Dmark Kobs.

Nyangweso plays for Cartha Queens Park in Glasgow.

Professional career

Nyangweso played for Glasgow Warriors in the 2006-07 season. He played in the friendly match against Border Reivers. He scored a try in the match.

International career

Nyangweso was capped for Uganda in 2001.

He was also capped for the Uganda 7s.

References

External links
 Zambian fans write off squad ahead of Uganda match
 Murray vows to stand down despite Cartha run
 Anthony Nyangweso publicity photo

Living people
Rugby union centres
Rugby union wings
Glasgow Warriors players
Uganda international rugby union players
Cartha Queens Park RFC players
Year of birth missing (living people)